Conduent Inc. is an American business services provider company headquartered in Florham Park, New Jersey.  It was formed in 2017 as a divestiture from Xerox. The company offers digital platforms for businesses and governments. , it had over 31,000 employees working across 22 countries.

History
On 5 June 2016, Xerox announced that it would be spinning off its Xerox Business Services division into a wholly separate corporation, for which the name was yet to be determined. The business scope of the new company was generally understood to be essentially identical to that of former business services company Affiliated Computer Services (ACS), which Xerox had acquired six years earlier in 2010.

On 6 October 2016, having previously announced its intent to separate into two separate companies, Xerox announced the identity of the new business services company as Conduent. It described the company's "coined name" as "inspired by the company's expertise in managing transactional relationships between their clients and their constituents".

On 3 January 2017, Conduent formally came into existence following its separation from Xerox. At the end of the first quarter of 2017, Carl Icahn owned 9.7% of the company.

In February 2019, Conduent sold some of its customer care contracts to Skyview Capital, which created a new business called Continuum Global Solutions LLC.

In February 2020, Conduent announced the appointment of Clifford Skelton to become the Chief Executive Officer. Prior to the appointment, Skelton has been serving as Conduent's interim CEO for seven months. He will continue as a member of Conduent's Board of directors.

In May 2021, Conduent settled with the United States Department of Labor to resolve allegations of discrimination in hiring during 2013–2015 under the operation of the previous company, Xerox Commercial Solutions. Conduent agreed to pay $395,000 to 1,624 Black, Asian, Native Hawaiian, and Pacific Islander job applicants.

Services and products 
Conduent provides business services such as medical billing, patient support services, electronic toll collection, Medicaid screening, and prepaid card processing for government benefits such as welfare, Social Security, and food stamps.

Awards and recognition 

 April 2021: Forbes ranked Conduent #486 in their annual list of America's Best Employers For Diversity.
 January 2022: named to 2022 ‘GovTech 100’ List of Companies

References

External links

Business process outsourcing companies of the United States
Xerox spin-offs
Business services companies established in 2017
American companies established in 2017
Companies listed on the New York Stock Exchange
Companies based in Morris County, New Jersey
Florham Park, New Jersey